

The DFS 40 (originally developed as the Delta V) was a tail-less research aircraft designed by Alexander Lippisch in 1937 as a follow-on to his Delta IV aircraft. In construction, the DFS was closer to a flying wing than its predecessor, and was built as an alternative to that aircraft.

The DFS 40 was flown for the first time by Heini Dittmar in 1939, shortly before Lippisch departed the DFS (Deutsche Forschungsanstalt für Segelflug - German Research Institute for Sailplane Flight) to begin work at Messerschmitt. Soon afterwards, without Lippisch there to supervise the project, the aircraft was crashed due to an error in center of gravity calculations that resulted in it entering a flat spin during flight.

Specifications (DFS 40)

1930s German experimental aircraft
World War II experimental aircraft of Germany
Lippisch aircraft
DFS 040
Single-engined pusher aircraft
Aircraft first flown in 1939
Tailless aircraft